Fedoseyev or Fedoseev is a Russian masculine surname, its feminine counterpart is Fedoseyeva or Fedoseeva. It may refer to
Dmitry Fedoseev (born 1965), Russian football player 
Lidiya Fedoseyeva-Shukshina (born 1938), Russian actress, wife of Vasily Shukshin
Nikolai Fedoseev (1871–1898), pioneer of Marxism in Russia
Oleg Fedoseyev (1936–2001), Russian long jumper
Vladimir Fedoseyev (born 1932), Russian classical conductor
Vladimir Fedoseev (born 1995), Russian chess grandmaster

See also
7741 Fedoseev, a minor planet

Russian-language surnames